Pillow Knob is a peak, 810 m, protruding through the snow cover at the northeast end of Williams Hills in the Neptune Range, Pensacola Mountains. Mapped by United States Geological Survey (USGS) from surveys and U.S. Navy air photos, 1956–66. The descriptive name was suggested by Dwight L. Schmidt, USGS geologist to these mountains, 1962–66.

Hills of Queen Elizabeth Land
Pensacola Mountains